The Kansas City Roos, known before July 1, 2019, as the UMKC Kangaroos and also sometimes called the Kansas City Kangaroos, are the intercollegiate teams representing the University of Missouri–Kansas City that compete in the National Collegiate Athletic Association's Division I. The Roos formerly competed in the Western Athletic Conference (WAC) but, as of July 1, 2020 the Kansas City Roos became members of the Summit League in all 14 varsity sports.

Sports
As a member of the Summit League the University of Missouri–Kansas City sponsors seven men's and nine women's teams in NCAA-sanctioned sports.

Soccer
Among the notable Roos soccer players have been goalkeepers Kevin Corby (Major Arena Soccer League and USL Championship (USL)) and Connor Sparrow (Major League Soccer and USL), defenders Coady Andrews (Major Indoor Soccer League, USL) and Roberto Albuquerque (USL), forwards Levi Coleman (USL, National Premier Soccer League (NPSL)), Eric McWoods (League of Ireland Premier Division), and Jordan Rideout (USL), and midfielders Manny Catano (USISL,  Eastern Indoor Soccer League, and the NPSL), Jony Muñoz (2020 Gatorade Boys' Soccer Player of the Year) and Bryan Pérez (United States Soccer Federation and USL). Former professional soccer player Ryan Pore has been the head coach of the Roos men's soccer team since January 2020.

The team was a member of the NCAA Division I Summit League from 1994 to 2013, and won the league men's soccer championships in 1996, 1999, 2001, 2003, and 2010. It then played seven seasons in the NCAA Division I Western Athletic Conference, returning to the Summit League in 2020. The team set an NCAA record on October 12, 2001, with the fastest trio of goals scored in Division I soccer during the MLS era, by scoring three times in 1:46 against Valparaiso University.

Conference affiliations
 1969–70 to 1985–86 – NAIA Independent
 1986–87 to 1993–94 – NCAA Division I Independent
 1994–95 to 2012–13 – Summit League
 2013–14 to 2019–20 – Western Athletic Conference
 2020–21 to present – Summit League

Name

The nickname was chosen in the 1930s for the school's debate team, following the acquisition of two baby kangaroos by the Kansas City Zoo.

The school has long branded itself for athletic purposes as "UMKC", but in June 2019, shortly before it announced its return to the Summit League, it unveiled a new logo and branding strategy emphasizing "Kansas City", and officially unveiled its full rebranding as the Kansas City Roos on July 1 of that year.

While its previous conference, the WAC, used "UMKC", its current conference, the Summit League, uses "Kansas City". As part of the 2019 rebranding, the program is now known as Kansas City Athletics. Teams will be known as the Kansas City Roos, with "Roos" having long been used as a short form for the historic nickname of Kangaroos. The national media had been inconsistent in usage prior to the 2019 rebranding.

References

External links